Frink is a surname of North German origin.

People with the surname
 Albert Frink, American businessman and politician
 Bill Frink (1926–2005), American sportscaster
 Charles N. Frink (fl. 1860–1896), Wisconsin insurance executive and Populist legislator
 Daniel A. Frink (1835–1885), American politician
 Elisabeth Frink (1930–1993), English sculptor and printmaker
 Fred Frink (1911–1995), American baseball player
 John Frink (born 1964), American writer and TV producer
 John M. Frink (1855–1914), Washington State politician and businessperson
 Orrin Frink (1901–1988), American mathematician who introduced Frink ideals
 Pat Frink (1945–2012), American basketball player
 Stephen Frink (born 1978), American underwater photographer

See also
 Frink (disambiguation)
 Golden Frinks (1920–2004), African-American civil rights activist
 Professor Frink, fictional character in The Simpsons

References

North German surnames
Surnames from given names